Joshua R. Olson is an American screenwriter and podcaster, known for writing the 2005 film A History of Violence.

Career 
Olson wrote and directed the low budget horror film Infested in 2002. He wrote the screenplay for the 2005 film A History of Violence.. He was nominated for the British Academy Award, the Writer's Guild Award and the Academy Award.

In 2006, Olson collaborated with Harlan Ellison on an adaptation of the author's short story "The Discarded" for ABC's series Masters of Science Fiction. He worked on Peter Jackson's film based on the Halo video game series, but the project was later cancelled.

Olson wrote the first draft of the movie Jack Reacher, for Paramount Pictures. . Ultimately, the movie was written and directed by Christopher McQuarrie 

Olson wrote two seasons of the audio drama, Bronzeville, which is produced by and stars Laurence Fishburne and Larenz Tate. He is one of the hosts of the film interview podcast, "The Movies That Made Me", along with director Joe Dante.

Olson co-hosts with Dave Anthony The West Wing Thing, a podcast rewatching and discussing episodes of The West Wing and its impact on politics. In 2020, Olson started Rainy Day Podcasts with Mick Jagger, Steve Bing, and Victoria Pearman. The company has a "first look deal" with Warner Brothers, and will produce original narrative podcasts.

Filmography

References

External links

 Josh Olson interview, 'Pursue The Passion', 14 November 2007.

American male screenwriters
Year of birth missing (living people)
Living people